Boden Garrison is a major garrison in Sweden, located in and around Boden in Norrbotten County. The garrison has during the 20th century been, and still is, the largest garrison in Sweden, consisting of several units of the Swedish Armed Forces as well as Boden Fortress.

History 

Before the decision to construct Boden Fortress, there was no permanently stationed military unit in Boden. The main military presence were the four tenement soldiers of Bodens kompani (Boden Company)—part of Norrbotten Regiment (I 19)—that lived in the locality. To provide men for the fortress, several units were either created in, or moved to the newly built garrison. The first unit garrisoned in Boden was Boden Engineer Corps, and engineering battalion, in 1905 (even though the official move was not made until in 1908). Soon to follow were infantry and artillery units that had wartime stationing in and around the fortress, and other supporting units.

From 1910 and on, the garrison was developed from a pure fortress garrison to a training centre for troops serving in the whole of upper Norrland. More than 60 percent of Norrbotten Regiment were to be used for the field army in case of mobilisation right before the First World War. On 1 January 1914, 709 permanently employed soldiers and officers were stationed in Boden, and 4,710 conscripts were trained in the garrison during the year, this in a locality with a population of 4,952.

During the Second World War, the mission of Norrbotten Regiment changed from manning the fortress to guarding the northern borders, and the infantry unit supposed to protect the fortress was instead Värmland Regiment that would be transported from southwestern Sweden up to Boden in case of mobilisation. A further move from fortress garrison was taken in 1957 when the armoured unit Norrbotten Armoured Battalion was created. The first air unit was stationed in Boden already in 1916, when a small detachment of three aircraft and 29 personnel was moved there from the army air force station in Malmslätt. During the years, further detachments were located in Boden garrison from time to time, but it was not until 1959 that Boden got its own flying unit, through the helicopter unit Arméns helikopterskola.

The massive cutdowns of the Swedish Armed Forces in the 1990s and 2000s saw several old regiments disband, merge, or move, which affected Boden as well. Several independent regiments and battalions stationed in the garrison were reduced in size and merged into Norrbotten Regiment. Even after the cutdowns, Boden Garrison retained the position as the largest garrison in Sweden and the main training centre for conscripts. The garrison houses the only remaining artillery regiment of the armed forces and is the only remaining garrison housing more than one Swedish Army regiment.

Units

Commanders 

As the garrison only became an actual organisation in the armed forces in 1975, there was no official garrison commander until then, however the commandants of Boden Fortress had extended powers over the military units stationed in the garrison. The position Commander Boden Garrison has since been occupied by:

Citations

References 
<div style="font-size: 90%;">
All sources in  unless otherwise noted.
Books

News

Online